Black Saint and Soul Note are two affiliated Italian independent record labels. Since their conception in the 1970s, they have released albums from a variety of influential jazz musicians, particularly in the genre of free jazz.

History
Black Saint was established in 1975 by Giacomo Pelliciotti and devoted to recording avant-garde musicians who might not have an opportunity elsewhere. In 1979, a sister label, Soul Note, was established as a home for artists who, while being no less creative, might be considered slightly closer to the mainstream.

The labels specialize in avant-garde jazz stemming from the free jazz tradition. Some of its roster of artists were members of the Chicago-based music association Association for the Advancement of Creative Musicians and the St. Louis-based multidisciplinary arts collectives Black Artists Group and the Human Arts Ensemble.

The company was based in Tribiano, Italy. Many of the recordings were made in Milan, as the performers passed through the area on tour, although many leading Italian musicians, such as Giorgio Gaslini, have also recorded for the label. Giovanni Bonandrini's son Flavio ran the company until its sale in 2008, the elder Bonandrini having retired, and has supervised many recording sessions in New York City.

Starting in 1984, Black Saint/Soul Note won the Down Beat Critics Poll for best record label for six subsequent years until they were replaced by Blue Note in 1990.

Cam Jazz acquired the company in 2008.

Discography

Black Saint

Soul Note

References

External links
Official website
Murecstudio recording Milan
Site featuring selected albums and covers
Interview with Bonandrini

Italian independent record labels
Jazz record labels
Record labels established in 1975
1975 establishments in Italy